Anthotopos is a village in the municipality of Kozani, Kozani regional unit, Greece. It is situated at an altitude of 758 meters above sea level. The postal code is 50100, and the telephone code is +30 24610. The population was 153 at the 2011 census.

History 
During the Ottoman Era the village was known as Kalburcular (Καλπουρτζιλάρ). However it was renamed to Koskinia (Κοσκινιά) in 1927. Later in 1961 it was renamed to Anthotopos.

According to the statistics of Bulgarian ethnographer Vasil Kanchov from 1900, 200 inhabitants lived in Kalburcular (Калбуджиларъ) all Muslim Turks.

The village had a mosque in the past during the Ottoman Era. After the Greco-Turkish Population Exchange, the mosque was used as a church until 1950, when it was demolished.

References

Populated places in Kozani (regional unit)